Gilbert Gérintès (16 August 1902 – 15 May 1968) was a French rugby union player who competed in the 1924 Summer Olympics. In 1924 he won the silver medal as member of the French team.

References

External links
profile

1902 births
1968 deaths
Sportspeople from Saint-Étienne
French rugby union players
Olympic rugby union players of France
Rugby union players at the 1924 Summer Olympics
Olympic silver medalists for France
France international rugby union players
Medalists at the 1924 Summer Olympics